Zhaoyuan is a county-level city within the prefecture-level city of Yantai, Shandong Province, China, located on the Bohai Sea. Zhaoyuan is well known for its abundant gold deposit and production, and is occasionally nicknamed "China's gold capital".

History
The area was first incorporated under the Han dynasty as Qucheng County.

Gold was discovered at Zhaoyuan in the Tang dynasty. The myth accompanying the city's discovery of gold is that a giant tortoise named Ao once told villagers struggling with famine to dig, and upon digging, they struck gold.

The county was named Zhaoyuan County in 1131.

People's Republic of China 
Five townships in Zhaoyuan were upgraded to towns on September 1, 1988.

On December 21, 1991, Zhaoyuan was upgraded from a county to a county-level city.

Throughout the mid-1990s, three more townships were upgraded to towns.

The Fifth National Population Census of the People's Republic of China reported that Zhaoyuan had a population of 593,705.

On December 19, 2000, Dahuchenjia Township became the city's last township to be upgraded to a town.

2014 murder of Wu Shuoyan 

In late May 2014, five members of The Church of Almighty God, an outlawed new-age cult, entered a McDonald's in Zhaoyuan and began soliciting customers' phone numbers. When 37 year-old Wu Shuoyan refused to give her phone number to the group, they claimed she was an "evil spirit", and began beating her with chairs and a metal mop handle, ultimately killing her. In February 2015, two of the attackers were executed, and the other three received jail sentences ranging from seven years to life.

Geography 
The city's terrain is higher in the northeast, middle and west, and lower in the northwest and southeast

Climate 

Administrative divisions 
Zhaoyuan administers five subdistricts and nine towns.

Subdistricts 

Towns 

Economy
The city has a significant amount of gold deposits, largely concentrated in its northeast. Zhaojin Mining has its headquarters located in the city. Additionally, Linglong Tire is headquartered in the city.

Transport 
National Highway 206 runs through Zhaoyuan.

Tourist attractions
The statue is 15 meters tall and 20 meters long.

The  is located in Zhaoyuan.

Notable people
Chi Haotian, PLA General, Minister of National Defense of the People's Republic of China
Sun Baoguo, BTBU Professor, Academician of Chinese Academy of Engineering

References 

Cities in Shandong
Yantai